Sriram Raghavan (born 22 June 1963) is an Indian film director and screenwriter who works in Hindi cinema. He is primarily considered an auteur of neo-noir action thrillers.

Raghavan made his directorial debut with Ek Hasina Thi (2004). He then went on to direct the critically acclaimed Johnny Gaddaar (2007), an adaptation of the 1963 French movie Symphonie Pour Un Massacre (The Corrupt) by Jacques Deray; followed by the action spy film Agent Vinod (2012) starring Saif Ali Khan; a critical and commercial failure. Raghavan's followup Badlapur (2015), a film based on Death's Dark Abyss by Massimo Carlotto met with positive reviews and was a moderate commercial success at the box office.

Raghavan's prominence increased with Andhadhun (2018) which tells the story of a blind piano player who unwittingly becomes embroiled in the murder of a retired actor. The film received critical acclaim and was commercially successful. He is the recipient of several accolades, including two National film Awards and two Filmfare Awards.

Early life
Raghavan was born in Bombay (Mumbai), Maharashtra in a Tamil family to a botanist father and a movie-loving mother. He grew up in Pune, where he did his schooling at the St. Vincent's High School. He also studied economics at Fergusson College in Pune.

He is a graduate of Film and Television Institute of India (FTII), Pune. Rajkumar Hirani, one of his batch-mates, edited his diploma 
film, The Eight Column Affair, which went on win the National Film Award in 1987. He is the brother of Sridhar Raghavan, a writer known for the television series, C.I.D., and the 2019 action thriller, War.

Career
Raghavan started his career before joining the FTII for Stardust, but left since he wasn't interested in it. Post his FTII studies, he made a documentary Raman Raghav, with Raghuvir Yadav.
Later he worked as a writer for television soaps, writing many episodes of CID and Aahat, and also directed one episode of the Star bestseller called 'First Kill' Later, he met Ram Gopal Varma, who liked his work in Raman Raghav, and signed him up for the film Ek Hasina Thi, a dark thriller starring Saif Ali Khan and Urmila Matondkar.

Raghavan later went on to direct another thriller, Johnny Gaddaar, which marked the debut of Neil Nitin Mukesh. The film was positively received by critics, though it didn't fare well at the box office; it has since been considered a cult classic. His third film was the spy thriller Agent Vinod which is not a remake of the 1977 action film of the same name Starring Saif Ali Khan as the titular character alongside Kareena Kapoor, it received mixed reviews from critics and failed at the box office.

Raghavan next directed and wrote the revenge thriller Badlapur starring Varun Dhawan, Nawazuddin Siddiqui, Huma Qureshi, Yami Gautam which was released on 20 February 2015. Based on the novel Death's Dark Abyss by Italian writer Massimo Carlotto, it received positive reviews from critics. Sudhish Kamath from The Hindu wrote "Sriram Raghavan’s latest is a fantastic return to form and the kind of cinema he revels in making: character-driven narratives with funny, dark, explosive situations, a realistic exploration of filmy tropes." The film won six Filmfare Awards including Best Film and Best Director. It was a moderate box office success, grossing over  worldwide.

Raghavan's next venture was the black comedy crime thriller Andhadhun, starring Ayushmann Khurana, Tabu, and Radhika Apte, which released on 5 October 2018 to critical acclaim. Raghavan saw L'Accordeur (The Piano Tuner), a 2010 French short film about a blind pianist, in 2013 at the recommendation of his friend, filmmaker Hemanth M Rao and was inspired by it.  In a positive review of the film, Sushant Mehta of India Today wrote, "Raghavan's ability to shock an entire cinema hall including the most immovable, emotionless fan coupled with his ability to make the audience laugh during these moments where your heart is in your mouth defines his unique brand of cinema".
The film earned  worldwide, a majority of which came from the Chinese box office, to become his highest-grossing release and one of Indian cinema's biggest grossers.

Media image
Raghavan applauded the recent Tamil film Varisu and called it an heart-warming film.

Filmography

Awards

References

External links

 

1963 births
Living people
Artists from Pune
Film and Television Institute of India alumni
Indian male screenwriters
Hindi-language film directors
Filmfare Awards winners
Screen Awards winners
Indian Tamil people
Film directors from Maharashtra
21st-century Indian film directors
Best Adapted Screenplay National Film Award winners
International Indian Film Academy Awards winners